"Blaze of Glory" is the debut solo single by Jon Bon Jovi which reached No. 1 on the Billboard Hot 100,  Cash Box Top 100 and the Mainstream rock chart in 1990, his only chart-topper away from his band Bon Jovi. The song also reached No. 1 on the Billboard Album Rock Tracks chart. "Blaze of Glory" also topped the ARIA music chart in Australia for a total of six weeks, and reached No. 13 on the UK Singles Chart.

Background
The power ballad was allegedly recorded by Jon Bon Jovi because Emilio Estevez requested Bon Jovi's song "Wanted Dead or Alive" for the soundtrack to Young Guns II, but Bon Jovi did not think the lyrics—about the band constantly touring—fit the theme of the Western movie. However, the request inspired him to write "Blaze of Glory" with lyrics more topical to the film.

The song features a music video and remains a crowd favorite with Bon Jovi fans, despite the fact that the song was not released as one of the band's singles, and only by Jon. The track is notable for the performance of Jeff Beck on guitar. The music video was filmed at The Rectory near Moab, Utah.

Personnel
Partial credits from various sources.
 Jon Bon Jovi - lead vocals, acoustic rhythm guitar, piano
Jeff Beck - lead and slide guitars
 Benmont Tench - Hammond organ
 Randy Jackson - bass
 Kenny Aronoff - drums

Charts

Weekly charts

Year-end charts

Sales and certifications

Awards

|-
| rowspan="7" | 1991 || Academy Awards || Best Original Song || 
|-
| American Music Awards || Favorite Pop/Rock Song || 
|-
| Golden Globe Awards || Best Original Song || 
|-
| rowspan="2" | Grammy Awards || Best Male Rock Vocal Performance || 
|-
| Best Song Written for Visual Media || 
|-
| rowspan="2" | MTV Video Music Awards || Best Male Video || 
|-
| Best Video from a Film ||

References

External links
 Jon Bon Jovi - Blaze of Glory on YouTube

1990 debut singles
Jon Bon Jovi songs
Best Original Song Golden Globe winning songs
Billboard Hot 100 number-one singles
Cashbox number-one singles
Number-one singles in Australia
Number-one singles in New Zealand
RPM Top Singles number-one singles
1990 songs
Hard rock ballads
Song recordings produced by Danny Kortchmar
Song recordings produced by Jon Bon Jovi
Vertigo Records singles